Poverty Valley Aerodrome  is a small aerodrome located near Poverty Valley, Saskatchewan, Canada. This location is near Highway 612 south of Neidpath. McMahon is to the west, and Hodgeville to the east. Swift Current is the nearest large centre to the north west on the Trans Canada Highway.

See also 
 List of airports in Saskatchewan

References 

Registered aerodromes in Saskatchewan
Whiska Creek No. 106, Saskatchewan